The Ernstberg (also Erresberg) southeast of Hinterweiler is, at 698.8 m, the highest of the west Eifel volcanoes and, after the Hohe Acht, the second highest mountain in the Eifel overall. Its summit consists of pyroclastic rocks (Schweißschlacken) that form a volcanic crater that is open towards the east. This is where the basalt masses flowed out, forming a semicircle on the eastern slope of the mountain. It lies within the Waldeifel region.

In winter there are excellent winter sports conditions on the Ernstberg due to its height. Cut langlauf tracks, a toboggan slope and ski hire hut are available.

Somewhat below the summit is a cave that runs through to the other side of the mountain and which is a natural monument. The cave entrances are barred to prevent access.

Nature reserve 
On 20 September 1978, the Ernstberg was designated by the district council at Trier as a nature reserve. Its conservation aim is the preservation of the Early Pleistocene stratovolcano with its distinctive ring-shaped arrangement of its pyroclastic rock and basalt layers (Einlagerungen) (nepheline-leutzitite). In addition the aim is to preserve the colony of Perennial Honesty (Lunaria rediviva).

References

External links 
 Act concerning the Ernstberg Nature Reserve dated  20 September 1978
 Map at the landscape information system of the Rhineland-Palatinate Conservation Authority

Mountains and hills of Rhineland-Palatinate
Mountains and hills of the Eifel
Mountains under 1000 metres
Nature reserves in Rhineland-Palatinate
Vulkaneifel
Natural monuments in Rhineland-Palatinate